Many people have engaged in cross-dressing during wartime under various circumstances and for various motives. This has been especially true of women, whether while serving as a soldier in otherwise all-male armies, while protecting themselves or disguising their identity in dangerous circumstances, or for other purposes.

Conversely, men would dress as women to avoid being drafted, the mythological precedent for this being Achilles hiding at the court of Lycomedes dressed as a woman to avoid participation in the Trojan War.

Historical

Fourteenth century
 Joanna of Flanders (c. 1295–1374) led the Montfortist faction in Brittany in the 1340s after the capture of her husband left her as the titular head of the family. She wore male dress at engagements such as the siege of Hennebont.

Fifteenth century

 Onorata Rodiani (1403–1452) was an Italian mercenary who served as a cavalry soldier, disguised in male clothing and with a male name, under a condottieri (freelance commander) named Oldrado Lampugnano beginning in 1423.
 Jacqueline of Wittelsbach, Countess of Hainaut, Holland and Zeeland (1401–1436) led the Hoek faction (the aristocratic faction) in Holland. Jacqueline and one of her servants disguised themselves as soldiers to escape confinement in Ghent.
 Joan of Arc (1412–1431) is a folk heroine of France and a Roman Catholic saint. A peasant girl born in what is now eastern France who claimed divine guidance, she led the French army to several important victories during the Hundred Years' War. After being captured by her enemies, she was burned at the stake for heresy when she was 19 years old. She journeyed through hostile Burgundian territory disguised as a male soldier.

Sixteenth century
 Brita Olofsdotter, widow of soldier Nils Simonsson, dressed as a man and enlisted in the Finnish unit in the Swedish cavalry in Livonia. She was killed in battle, and King John III of Sweden ordered her salary to be paid to her family.

Seventeenth century
 Catalina de Erauso (1592–1650), the Nun Lieutenant, was a semilegendary Spanish adventurer.
 Aal de Dragoner (died before 1710), served as a Dutch dragoon. After death her body was put on display in an anatomical theatre.
 Christian Davies (1667–1739), "Mother Ross", served in the 2nd Dragoons (Scots Greys).

Eighteenth century
 Louise Antonini (1771–1861) was a French woman who disguised herself as a male to join the French Navy during the revolutionary period and the Napoleonic wars.
 Bonnie Prince Charlie (1720–1788)  dressed as Flora MacDonald's maidservant, Betty Burke, to escape the Battle of Culloden for the island of Skye in 1746.
 The Chevalier d'Éon (1728–1810) fought with the French dragoons during the Seven Years' War. In 1777 d'Éon began dressing full time as a woman and lived as such until death. When d’Éon died in London in 1810, the body was examined by physicians and discovered to be anatomically male.
 Francina Broese Gunningh (1783–1824) was a Dutch soldier who served in the French, Prussian and Dutch armies.
 Phoebe Hessel (1713–1821) enlisted in the British Army's 5th Regiment of Foot. She fought in the Battle of Fontenoy and was wounded in action.
 Johanna Sophia Kettner (1724–1802) may have been the first female to attain the rank of corporal in the Austrian army.
 Anna Maria Lane (1755–1810) dressed as a man to join the Continental Army  in 1776 and fight in the American Revolutionary War with her husband until 1781, later received a pension for her courage in the  Battle of Germantown.
 Deborah Sampson (1760–1827) of Massachusetts was the first known American woman who disguised herself as a man ("Robert Shurtliff") to enlist as an infantry soldier. She served in the Continental Army in the Revolutionary War.
 Franziska Scanagatta (1776–1865) was an Italian woman who attended Austrian military school and served in the French Revolution as a lieutenant.
 Marie Schellinck (1757–1840) was a Belgian woman who fought in the French Revolution, becoming a sub-lieutenant.
 Hannah Snell (1723–1792) was an Englishwoman who entered military service under the name "James Gray", initially for the purpose of searching for her missing husband. She served in General Guise's regiment in the army of the Duke of Northumberland, and then in the marines.
 Ulrika Eleonora Stålhammar (1688–1733) was a female Swedish soldier during the Great Northern War, later put on trial for having served in the military posing as a man.
 Joanna Żubr (1770–1852) was a Polish soldier of the Napoleonic Wars and the first woman to receive the Virtuti Militari, the highest Polish military order.

Nineteenth century

 Albert Cashier (1843–1915), born Jennie Irene Hodgers, was an Irish-born woman who served three years in the Union Army during the American Civil War as a male soldier, and lived the next fifty years as a man.
 Maria Quitéria (1792–1853) was a heroine in the independence of Brazil, when she fought against the Portuguese troops in Bahia. Later, she was awarded by the Emperor Dom Pedro I.
 Jane Dieulafoy (1851–1916) was a French woman who, when her husband enlisted during the Franco-Prussian War, dressed as a man and fought alongside him.
 Nadezhda Durova (1783–1866) was a decorated Russian cavalry soldier of the Napoleonic Wars who spent nine years disguised as a man.
 Eleonore Prochaska (1785–1813) was a German woman soldier who fought in the Lützow Free Corps during the War of the Sixth Coalition.
 Friederike Krüger (1789–1848) was a soldier in the Prussian army.
 James Barry (c. 1792–1795 – 1865) was a military surgeon in the British Army who was born female and named Margaret Ann Bulkley.
 Anna Lühring (1796–1866) (sometimes wrongly referred to as Anna Lührmann) was a German soldier in the Lützow Free Corps during the Napoleonic Wars.
 Nathaniel Lyon (1818–1861) General for the Union during the American Civil War, allegedly dressed as a woman to spy on an enemy encampment.
 Giuseppa Bolognara Calcagno (1826–1884) was a heroine in the liberation of Catania in support of Garibaldi's Expedition of the Thousand; she wore only men's clothing, lived like a man among the male soldiers, and was awarded the Silver Medal of Military Valor.
 Frances Clayton (c. 1830 – after 1863) was an American woman who disguised herself as a man to fight for the Union Army in the American Civil War.
 Mária Lebstück (1831–1892)  was a Hussar officer during the Hungarian War of Independence of 1848 and 1849 under the name Károly Lebstück.
 Sarah Rosetta Wakeman (1843–1864) served with the Union Army in the American Civil War under the Alias of Lyons Wakeman and Edwin R. Wakeman. Her letters remain one of the few surviving primary accounts of female soldiers in the American Civil War.
 Sarah Emma Edmonds (1841–1898) served with the Union Army in the American Civil War disguised as a man named Frank Thompson.
 Mollie Bean served with the Confederate Army in the American Civil War under the alias Melvin Bean.
 Mary and Molly Bell, cousins who both served with the Confederate Army in the American Civil War.
 Cathay Williams (1844–1892) was a former slave who became the first recorded African-American woman in the U.S. Army.
 Loreta Janeta Velazquez a.k.a. "Lieutenant Harry Buford" (1842 – c. 1897) – A Cuban woman who donned Confederate garb and served as a Confederate officer and spy during the war.
 Rani of Jhansi (1828–1858) fought in the Indian Rebellion of 1857 by dressing as a sowar on behalf of her adopted son. Her identity was revealed when she was slain in battle.
 Tringë Smajli (1880–1917), known simply as Tringe Smajli, and as Yanitza outside Albania, was an Albanian guerrilla fighter who fought against the Ottoman Empire in the Malësia region. She was the daughter of Smajl Martini, a Catholic clan leader of the Grudë tribe of Malësia as a burnesha, at the time of her brother's deaths, Tringe became a sworn virgin – she took a vow of chastity and wore male clothing in order to live as a man in the patriarchal northern Albanian society.

Twentieth century
 Viktoria Savs joined the Austrian army during World War I.
 Flora Sandes joined the Serbian army during World War I.
 Wanda Gertz (1896–1958) joined the Polish Legion in World War I to fight on the Eastern Front while posing as "Kazimierz Zuchowicz". Later she joined the Women's Voluntary Legion, and during World War II she commanded an all-woman sabotage unit of the Home Army.
 Dorothy Lawrence (1896–1964) was a British reporter who served as a man in the army during World War I.
 Zoya Smirnow (1897/98 – after 1916) was a Russian schoolgirl who along with 11 other friends ran away from their Moscow school and disguised themselves as men and joined the Russian army where they fought in Galicia and the Carpathians during World War I. After a death and number of injuries in the group, Smirnow's sex was discovered. She recounted their story to the English press.
 Frieda Belinfante (1904–1995) was a prominent musician and World War II Dutch Resistance fighter who disguised herself as a man for 6 months to avoid capture by the Gestapo.
 Henk Jonker (1912–2002) was a member of the Dutch resistance who disguised himself as a woman.
 Sylvin Rubinstein (1914–2011) was a member of the Polish resistance who disguised himself as a woman to perform espionage missions and assassinations.
 Ehud Barak (b. 1942), the later prime minister of Israel, disguised himself as a woman to assassinate members of the Palestine Liberation Organization in Beirut during the 1973 covert mission Operation Spring of Youth.

Fiction, legend and mythology 

 Epipole of Carystus was a Greek woman described by Chennos as having joined the Greek army during the Trojan War.
 Hua Mulan was, according to a famous Chinese poem, a woman who joined the Chinese army in her father's stead.
 In the Albanian folk tale of Nora of Kelmendi, she is a 17th century woman warrior, sometimes referred to as the "Helen of Albania" as her beauty also sparked a great war. In some tales she is referred to as a burrnesha fighting an Ottoman attack on her village with a band of women in Malësia because she declined to join the attacker's harem and killing him in a duel.
 In J.R.R. Tolkien's fantasy novel The Lord of the Rings, the noblewoman Éowyn fights dressed as a man in the Battle of the Pelennor Fields.
 In All the Queen's Men, a 2001 comedy set during WWII, cross-dressing is a central plot device.
 Terry Pratchett's novel Monstrous Regiment is a satirical look at the phenomenon.
 I Was a Male War Bride is a comedy where the male French officer, played by Cary Grant, must dress like a woman to return as a war bride of his American military wife.
 One of the running gags of the TV series M*A*S*H is Klinger's attempts to get discharged from military service by crossdressing.
 In the Disney film Mulan, which is based on the story of Hua Mulan, Mulan dresses as a young man to save her father from being drafted.
 In Tamora Pierce's The Song of the Lioness quartet of books, Alanna of Trebond disguises herself as a boy to train to become a royal knight, a position only given to noble-born boys.
 Genesis Climber Mospeada was perhaps the first anime series to feature a regular crossdresser, Yellow Belmont, amongst the main protagonists.
 H. E. Bates's novel The Triple Echo is about a World War II army deserter who cross-dresses to avoid arrest. This was made into a film in 1972.
 Mary "Jacky" Faber does this as the titular heroine of the Bloody Jack series of novels, fighting in the Napoleonic Wars.
 Leviathan by Scott Westerfeld, a steampunk novel in which Deryn "Dylan" Sharp disguises herself so she can join the Royal Air Service.
 The Shadow Campaigns novel series by Django Wexler has a female main character rise through the ranks of an army while disguised as a man.
 In The Guns of the South by Harry Turtledove, an American Civil War alternate history, a secondary character called Mollie Bean is shown serving in the 47th North Carolina as 'Melvin Bean'.

References